Charged multivesicular body protein 4c is a protein that in humans is encoded by the CHMP4C gene.

References

External links

Further reading